Buta is a 2011 Azerbaijani drama film written and directed by Ilgar Najaf. The film was selected as the Azerbaijani entry for the Best Foreign Language Oscar at the 85th Academy Awards, but it did not make the final shortlist. In 2011 it won the Asia Pacific Screen Award for Best Children's Feature Film.

See also
 List of submissions to the 85th Academy Awards for Best Foreign Language Film
 List of Azerbaijani submissions for the Academy Award for Best Foreign Language Film

References

External links
 

2011 films
2011 drama films
2011 directorial debut films
Azerbaijani drama films
Azerbaijani-language films